The 2016 United States House of Representatives elections in Kansas were held on November 8, 2016, to elect the four U.S. representatives from the state of Kansas, one from each of the state's four congressional districts. The elections coincided with the 2016 U.S. presidential election, as well as other elections to the House of Representatives, elections to the United States Senate and various state and local elections. The primaries were held on August 2.

Overview

District 1

Incumbent Republican Tim Huelskamp defeated a little-known opponent, former school administrator Alan LaPolice, in the Republican primary election by a closer than expected margin of 55% to 45% in the 2014 elections. Because of this, his poor relationship with House Republican leadership and his support for cutting farm subsidies, which cost him the support of the Kansas Farm Bureau and Kansas Livestock Association in 2014, he was thought to be vulnerable to a primary challenge. In the primary election on August 2, 2016, Huelskamp was defeated 57%-43%.

Republican primary

Candidates

Nominee
 Roger Marshall, obstetrician

Eliminated in primary
 Tim Huelskamp, incumbent U.S. Representative

Declined
 Garrett Love, state senator

Polling

Results

Libertarian

Nominee
 Kerry Burt

Independent
Declared
 Alan LaPolice, former school administrator and Republican candidate for this seat in 2014

General election

Results

District 2

Republican primary

Candidates

Nominee
 Lynn Jenkins, incumbent U.S. Representative

Results

Democratic primary

Candidates

Nominee
 Britani Potter, financial consultant and Ottawa School Board Member

Withdrawn
 James Pryor

Results

Libertarian

Nominee
 James Houston Bales

General election

Endorsements

Results

District 3

Incumbent Republican Kevin Yoder faced a primary challenge from retired U.S. Army officer Greg Goode, who ran strongly to the right; Yoder easily won.

As of June 2016, Yoder had raised far more money in campaign contributions than either his Republican primary opponent or his Democratic rival.

Republican primary

Candidates

Nominee
 Kevin Yoder, incumbent U.S. Representative

Eliminated in primary
 Greg Goode,  of Louisburg, retired U.S. Army lieutenant colonel

Declined
 Milton R. Wolf, physician and candidate for Senate in 2014.

Results
Election results were as follows:

Democratic primary
Three candidates ran in the Democratic primary. Businessman Jay Sidie of Mission Woods won a three-way Democratic primary.

Candidates

Nominee
 Jay Sidie, financial counselor

Eliminated in primary
 Nathaniel McLaughlin president of the Kansas NAACP
 Reggie Marselus, retired union official

Results
Election results were as follows:

Libertarian

Candidates

Nominee
 Steve Hohe

General election

Results

District 4

Republican primary

Candidates

Nominee
 Mike Pompeo, incumbent U.S. Representative

Results

Democratic primary

Candidates

Nominee
 Daniel B. Giroux, attorney and small business owner

Eliminated in primary
Robert Tillman, retired court officer, Kansas National Guard veteran, candidate for this seat in 2010 and nominee in 2012

Results

Libertarian

Nominee 
 Gordon Bakken

Independent
Declared
 Miranda Allen

General election

Endorsements

Results

References

External links
U.S. House elections in Kansas, 2016 at Ballotpedia
Campaign contributions at OpenSecrets

Kansas
2016
House